Wang Jiang (born July 1963) is a Chinese banker and the current party secretary of China Everbright Group, in office since March 2022. He previously served as president of China Construction Bank and before that, president of the Bank of China.

He is a delegate to the 13th National People's Congress.

Biography
Wang was born in Rushan, Shandong, in July 1963. After resuming the college entrance examination in 1980, he entered Shandong Economics College (now Shandong University of Finance and Economics), majoring in finance. He joined the Chinese Communist Party (CCP) in December 1983. After graduating in 1984, he stayed at the college and worked successively as assistant, instructor, and associate professor.

Since June 1999, he served in various posts in China Construction Bank before being promoted to vice president of the Bank of Communications in March 2015. 

In July 2017, he was appointed vice governor of Jiangsu, but having held the position for only two years.

In December 2019, he was made president of the Bank of China, and held that office until January 2021, when he moved back to China Construction Bank as its president.

On 4 March 2022, he took office as party secretary of China Everbright Group, the top political position in the state-owned enterprise.

References

1963 births
Living people
People from Rushan, Shandong
Shandong University of Finance and Economics alumni
Xi'an Jiaotong University alumni
Xiamen University alumni
Liaoning University alumni
Chinese bankers
People's Republic of China politicians from Shandong
Chinese Communist Party politicians from Shandong
Delegates to the 13th National People's Congress